Andraegoidus fabricii is a species of beetle in the family Cerambycidae. It was described by Henry Dupont in 1838.

References

Trachyderini
Beetles described in 1838